Frank or Franklin Lynch may refer to:

People 
Frank J. Lynch (1922–1987), lawyer, judge and politician from Pennsylvania
Frank Lynch (Gaelic footballer) (born 1938), Irish Gaelic games administrator, manager and player
Frank Lynch (trade unionist) (1909-1980), British trade union leader and politician
Budd Lynch (1917–2012), Detroit Red Wings' public address announcer
Frank C. Lynch-Staunton (1905–1990), Lieutenant Governor of Alberta, 1979–1985
Francis Lynch (1920–1993), also known as Frank Lynch, politician
Frank Lynch of Keller Sisters and Lynch
Franklin Lynch (serial killer) (born 1955), American serial killer on death row in California

Ships

See also
Francis Lynch (disambiguation)